Janis Hanek (born 12 February 1999) is a German professional footballer who plays as a midfielder.

Career
Hanek made his professional debut for Karlsruher SC on 19 August 2018, appearing in the first round of the 2018–19 DFB-Pokal against Bundesliga side Hannover 96. He was substituted on in the 62nd minute for Saliou Sané, with the match finishing as a 6–0 home loss.

References

External links
 
 

1999 births
Living people
People from Rastatt
Sportspeople from Karlsruhe (region)
Footballers from Baden-Württemberg
German footballers
Association football midfielders
Karlsruher SC II players
Karlsruher SC players
FC Astoria Walldorf players
2. Bundesliga players
3. Liga players
Regionalliga players